is a Japanese tokusatsu television drama. It is the 13th installment in the Kamen Rider Series. It is a joint collaboration between Ishinomori Productions and Toei, and was broadcast on TV Asahi from January 26, 2003, to January 18, 2004. This series was the first to use TV Asahi's current logo. It aired as a part of TV Asahi's 2003 Super Hero Time block, alongside Bakuryū Sentai Abaranger.

Story

The Smart Brain corporation, the world's most powerful corporation, is trying to take over the world using Orphnoch, the "next stage in humanity's evolution", to covertly kill off the human population. In pursuit of this, they develop three suits of power armor, called Rider Gears (each for Delta, Faiz, and Kaixa), to find and protect the Orphnoch King, who can fix a defect within Orphnoch DNA which causes their genetic structure to break down, leading to death.

The Rider Gears are stolen by Hanagata, the Goat Orphnoch and former chief of Smart Brain. He sends them to his foster children (dubbed the "Ryuseiji", after the school they attended) so they can stop the Orphnoch from achieving their goal. However, Rider Gears were designed to be worn by Orphnoch, and humans are unable to activate the systems without undergoing genetic modification.

A young loner, Takumi Inui, is unwittingly drawn into the conflict between the Orphnoch and humans and becomes Kamen Rider Faiz to save the life of Mari Sonoda, one of the Ryuseiji. Smart Brain begins targeting him in an attempt to retrieve the Faiz Gear.

However, there is division amongst the Orphnoch, as those who wish to co-exist with humans rather than kill them, begin resisting the Smart Brain, who in turn targets them as well. Most of these "renegade" Orphnochs are either killed, remain neutral, or begin siding with the Ryuseiji against the Smart Brain.

When the Tokyo police discover the Orphnoch are behind a series of bizarre murders, they begin operations to defeat the creatures, largely unaware of the various factions involved. They even begin performing experiments on captured Orphnoch in an attempt to find ways of destroying them, though this does not go well.

The Orphnoch King eventually awakens within a young boy named Teruo Suzuki, whom Naoya Kaido and Keitaro Kikuchi saved and befriended. Now, it is up to the holders of the Rider Gears to band together and fight for humanity's survival.

Production
The Kamen Rider 555 trademark was registered by Toei on October 29, 2002.

Rider Gears

The equipment used in the series to transform is referred to as Rider Gear. It was created to be worn by the Orphnoch to protect their Orphnoch King. Each Rider Gear contains a belt known as a Driver used to form armor that protects the wearer and amplifies their strengths and abilities. The armor's theme is based on a letter from the Greek alphabet, and contains the letter somehow within the aesthetic design. The Gears also have a method to input command codes, a cell phone number keypad for most, which can activate armor and various weapons. The sound effects of a dialing in any of the Rider Gear phones were later referenced in episode 17 of Kamen Rider Kabuto.

The TV series focused on three sets of Rider Gear: Faiz Gear, Kaixa Gear, and Delta Gear. During the TV series, Hanagata, the foster father of the Ryuseiji and former chief executive of Smart Brain, attempted to create several new Rider Gears, using two lost people to test out the first two. The two belts failed to create Rider armor, resulting in the wearer's deaths. When Itsuro Takuma of Lucky Clover wore the third one it disabled him for a few seconds before it dissolved. The fourth dissolved without ever being worn. The Kamen Rider 555 movie, Paradise Lost, introduced two additional sets of Rider Gear: Psyga Gear and Orga Gear.

Riotrooper army

The show featured a series of mass-produced transformation belts called Smart Buckle, which enabled the wearer to transform into a generic Riotrooper. The Riotroopers were introduced in the movie and later added at the end of the TV series.

Live stage-show
A live stage show of Kamen Rider Faiz featured three unique riders named Alpha, Beta, and Gamma.

Naming conventions
Each set of Rider Gear is code-locked, in addition to being only usable by Orphnoch. These codes, input through the phone of each Gear, are a set of numbers that relate to the theme of each Gear. For the Faiz Gear, the code is 5-5-5, or "fives", phonetically similar to the word Faiz. For the Kaixa Gear, the code is 9-1-3, which is read in goroawase as "Ka-I-Sa". Delta Gear's phone was voice-activated, yet nonetheless also was coded with 3-3-3, a reference to the Greek letter Delta, a triangle.

The goroawase system was also used for the Psyga Gear, where the code 3-1-5 is read as "Sa-I-Go". The Orga Gear, patterned after the Greek Omega, the final letter, is code-locked to 0-0-0.

Episodes

Films

Kamen Rider 555: Paradise Lost

, was released during the run of the series, as a double feature alongside Bakuryu Sentai Abaranger: Abare Summer is Freezing! on August 16, 2003. The film was 81 minutes long. A few new characters and Rider Gears were introduced in the film.

Kamen Rider Taisen

The film's website reveals that it would be released in Japanese theaters on March 29, 2014. Kohei Murakami and Kento Handa were confirmed to reprise their respective roles from Kamen Rider 555.

Super Hero Taisen GP

 is the 2015 entry of the "Super Hero Taisen" film series, featuring the cast of Kamen Rider Drive and the appearance of Kamen Rider 3, which was originally created by Shotaro Ishinomori for the one-shot 1972 manga . Kento Handa reprises his role in the film, which was scheduled to open in theaters on March 21, 2015, and its sequel , which has Mitsuru Karahashi reprising his role. In Kamen Rider 4, it reveals the truth after the end of Kamen Rider 555 TV series, especially on Takumi himself.

Hyper Battle Video
 features a boom box called the Faiz Sounder developed by the Smart Brain corporation appearing at the laundromat where Takumi, Mari, and Keitaro work at, causing them and everyone else to break into song and dance. The Faiz Sounder was created as a result of a contest for Televi Magazine for a new weapon for Kamen Rider Faiz.

Web-exclusive series
 is the second entry of the web-exclusive Kamen Rider Genms series released on Toei Tokusatsu Fan Club on April 17, 2022 and serves a crossover between Kamen Rider Ex-Aid, Kamen Rider Zero-One, and 555.
 is a web-exclusive crossover series of Toei Tokusatsu Fan Club between Ex-Aid, Zero-One, 555, Ryuki, Decade, and Saber released on October 16, 2022, which is a direct sequel to Kamen Rider Genms.

Novels
, written by Toshiki Inoue, is a novel adaptation. The novel was released on August 17, 2004.
, written by Toshiki Inoue, is part of a series of spin-off novel adaptions of the Heisei Era Kamen Riders. It is a reprint of Deformed Flowers, which added a five-year epilogue to the story. The novel was released on January 31, 2013.

Lost World
The S.I.C. Hero Saga side story for 555 published in Monthly Hobby Japan magazine was titled . It serves as a prologue to the alternate story that was 555: Paradise Lost, and features the new character . The story ran from October 2005 to January 2006.

Chapter titles

Video game
A video game based on the series was produced by Bandai for the PlayStation 2. It was a fighting game that featured many of the characters from the TV series. There were several modes of gameplay for either a single play or two players. It was released only in Japan near the end of the TV series on December 18, 2003.

Blu-ray release
In 2014, 555 received a three-part Blu-ray release. To promote the release, the cast reunited after 10 years, but they remarked that not much has changed, other than Yoshika Kato changing her stage name to Leilani Gaja and her new life in Hong Kong and series lead Kento Handa's recent popularity on the variety show Tamori Club where he has surprised guests with his knowledge of high-rise buildings and kayōkyoku.

Cast
: 
: 
: 
: 
: 
: 
: 
: 
: 
: 
: 
: 
: 
: 
: 
: 
: 
: 
: 
: 
: 
: 
: 
: 
Narration, Driver Voice:

Guest actors

: 
Yuji Kiba's father (1): 
Yuji Kiba's mother (1): 
: 
: 
Professor (7, 8): 
Gorgeous man (31, 32): 
:

Songs
Opening theme
"Justiφ's"
Lyrics: Shoko Fujibayashi
Composition: Kazuto Sato
Arrangement: Kōtarō Nakagawa
Artist: ISSA (of DA PUMP)
Episodes: 2 - 49

Insert themes
"Dead or alive"
Lyrics: Shoko Fujibayashi
Composition: Katsuya Yoshida
Arrangement: Akio Kondo
Artist: Shinichi Ishihara
Episodes: 2 - 20
"The people with no name"
Lyrics: Shoko Fujibayashi
Rap Lyrics: m.c.A.T
Composition: Cher Watanabe
Arrangement: RIDER CHIPS
Artist: RIDER CHIPS featuring m.c.A.T
Episodes: 21 - 32, 39
"EGO ~ eyes glazing over"
Lyrics: Shoko Fujibayashi
Composition & Arrangement: Cher Watanabe
Artist: ICHIDAI (of ROLL DAYS)
Episodes: 33 - 38, 41 - 48
"Justiφ's -Accel Mix-"
Lyrics: Shoko Fujibayashi
Composition: Kazuto Sato
Arrangement: Kazunori Miyake
Artist: ISSA (of DA PUMP)
Episodes: 40, Movie

References

External links
 
 
 Kamen Rider 555 DVD & Blu-ray Box 
 Korean Masked Rider Φ's  
 Official website for Kamen Rider Outsiders and Kamen Rider Genms 

Faiz
2003 Japanese television series debuts
2004 Japanese television series endings
Cyberpunk television series
Fiction with alternate endings
Zombies in television